Helen Iris Crooke  (14 December 1895 – 23 February 1985) was a New Zealand nurse and voluntary aid administrator. She was born in Lawrence, New Zealand, on 14 December 1895, and attended Nga Tawa Diocesan School from 1910 to 1913.

In the 1946 New Year Honours, Crooke was appointed a Member of the Order of the British Empire, in recognition of her service as head of the Red Cross Voluntary Aid Division.

References

1895 births
1985 deaths
New Zealand nurses
People from Lawrence, New Zealand
New Zealand Members of the Order of the British Empire
New Zealand women nurses
People educated at Nga Tawa Diocesan School